Maxwell Theodore "Max" Aaron (born February 25, 1992) is an American former figure skater. He is the 2013 U.S. national champion, the 2015 Skate America champion, the 2011 U.S. national junior champion, and a three-time U.S. International Classic champion (2012, 2013, and 2014). Aaron announced his retirement from figure skating on April 19, 2018.

Personal life 
Maxwell Theodore Aaron was born in Scottsdale, Arizona. The second of three children born to Mindy, a nurse, and Neil, a pediatrician, he has two sisters, Madeline and Molly, both of whom have competed in pair skating. He is Jewish, and was raised in a traditionally Conservative Jewish home. He said: I grew up looking to all those Jewish athletes for inspiration. I always thought the list needed to be longer. We needed to have a stronger representation of Jewish athletes, and I’m so happy that I’m part of them now.

Aaron attended Chaparral High School in Scottsdale and later Cheyenne Mountain High School, graduating in 2010. He received the Principal's List Award and was on the honor roll for four years. He then began studying at Pikes Peak Community College and the University of Colorado Colorado Springs, where he majors in finance with a minor in communication.

Career

Early years
Aaron began skating as a hockey player at age four, and took up figure skating at age nine to improve his skating skills. He competed in the USA Hockey nationals in 2006 and 2007. In 2007, he played U16 AAA hockey and was chosen for the US National Team Development Program. He led his league in goals and penalties for two years.

In the US Championships for figure skating, Aaron finished in 5th in the novice category in 2007 and 13th in the junior category in 2008. He continued to compete in both sports until he fractured the right and left of his L5 lumbar vertebrae. He spent four months in a body cast and another four in physical therapy, and was required to stay off the ice for a year.

Aaron later moved from Scottsdale, Arizona, where he had skated at the Ice Den, to Colorado Springs, Colorado, to train at the Broadmoor Skating Club and the World Arena. There, he picked Tom Zakrajsek as his head coach and Christy Krall for additional technical advice.

2009–2010 to 2010–2011
Aaron won the bronze medal at the U.S. national junior championships.

The following season, he won a silver medal at the SBC Cup in Karuizawa, Japan. He then won the national junior title. He then competed in the 2011 World Junior Championships in Gangneung, South Korea, and placed 5th.

2012–2013 season 
Aaron won gold at the 2012 U.S. International Classic. He took silver at the 2012 Cup of Nice. At the age of 20, Aaron won the 2013 U.S. Championships. His West Side Story free skate helped him score a total of 255 points to win the gold, ahead of silver medalist Ross Miner and three-time winner Jeremy Abbott.

2013–2014 season 
Aaron made his Grand Prix debut at the 2013 Skate America. In sixth place after the short, he placed second in the free and pulled up to win the bronze medal behind winner Tatsuki Machida and silver medalist Adam Rippon. He placed 7th at the NHK Trophy.

At the 2014 U. Championships, he took the bronze medal and was named to the 2014 World Championships. His 8th-place result at Worlds with Jeremy Abbott's 5th-place finish allowed the U.S. to regain its third spot in the men's event.

2014–2015 season 
Aaron won gold at his first ISU Challenger Series (CS) event, the 2014 U.S. International Classic. Turning to the Grand Prix series, he won the bronze medal at the 2014 Skate Canada International and placed 7th at the 2014 Rostelecom Cup. He finished fourth at the 2015 U.S. Championships.

2015–2016 season 
Aaron began his season with silver at the 2015 CS Nebelhorn Trophy followed by gold at a Grand Prix event, the 2015 Skate America. At the 2015 Trophee Eric Bompard, he placed 7th in the short program, which became the final result after the event was cancelled due to the November 2015 Paris attacks. Later that month, he was awarded gold at the 2015 CS Tallinn Trophy.

Aaron won the silver medal at the 2016 U.S. Championships. At the 2016 World Championships in Boston, he ranked 8th in the short program and went on to set a new record for a United States male skater in the free skate, earning a total of 254.14 points, although this was broken a few minutes later by his teammate Adam Rippon. Aaron finished in eighth place.

2016–2017 season 
Aaron decided to modify his approach to quad jumps, stating in August 2016: "I'm using an inside three turn (entrance). [...] It's kind of old school in a way, but it's been working. I wanted to try something new because obviously the three-turn wasn't working under pressure."

Aaron began his season with a pair of bronze medals, earned at the 2016 CS Autumn Classic International and 2016 CS Lombardia Trophy. He finished 4th at the 2016 Cup of China, 5th at the 2016 Rostelecom Cup, and 9th at the 2017 U.S. Championships.

2017–2018 season 
Aaron won silver at the 2017 U.S. International Classic and bronze at a Grand Prix event, the 2017 Cup of China. He placed 7th at his other Grand Prix assignment, the 2017 Internationaux de France, and 9th at the 2018 U.S. Championships.

U.S. Figure Skating did not select Aaron for the 2018 Winter Olympics but chose him for the 2018 Four Continents Championships and named him as a third alternate for the 2018 World Championships. He placed 5th in Taipei and was later called up to compete in Milan, where he finished 11th. He announced his retirement from competitive skating on April 19, 2018.

2021 - 2023 
Aaron currently works at Chelsea Piers in New York City as a skating coach.

Programs

Competitive highlights 

GP: Grand Prix; CS: Challenger Series; JGP: Junior Grand Prix

2009–2010 to present

2003–2004 to 2008–2009

Detailed results
Small medals for short and free programs awarded only at ISU Championships. Pewter medals for fourth-place finishes awarded only at U.S. national and regional events. At team events, medals awarded for team results only.

Senior career

Junior career

See also
List of select Jewish figure skaters

References

External links 

 
 
 Max Aaron at IceNetwork.com
 

1992 births
American male single skaters
Sportspeople from Scottsdale, Arizona
Figure skaters from Colorado Springs, Colorado
Living people
Jewish American sportspeople
University of Colorado Colorado Springs alumni
21st-century American Jews